Lippold is a surname. Notable people with the name include:

Georg Lippold (1885–1954), German archaeologist
Kirk Lippold (born 1959), United States Navy officers
Richard Lippold (1915–2002), American sculptor
Karl August Lippold (1821–1915), the first-rate copyist at Imperial porcelain factory, St Petersburg

See also
Ad Astra (Lippold sculpture), is a public artwork by Richard Lippold
Lippoldswilen, is a village and former municipality in the canton of Thurgau, Switzerland